Malgassoclanis is a genus of moths in the family Sphingidae first described by Robert Herbert Carcasson in 1968.

Species
Malgassoclanis delicatus (Jordan  1921)
Malgassoclanis suffuscus (Griveaud 1959)

References

Smerinthini
Moth genera
Taxa named by Robert Herbert Carcasson